Coreomyces is a genus of fungi in the family Laboulbeniaceae. The genus contain 20 species.

References

External links
Coreomyces at Index Fungorum

Laboulbeniaceae
Laboulbeniales genera